The Alburgh–Noyan Border Crossing connects the villages of Noyan, Quebec with Alburgh, Vermont on the Canada–US border. It is reached by Vermont Route 225 on the American side and by Quebec Route 225 on the Canadian side.

The Noyan/Alburgh port of entry is single building that houses both the US and Canada border inspection agencies, the first of five such facilities. While the two nations' agents work separately, they share the kitchen but have they have own cell. In the kitchen they used to share the same refrigerator but now they have their respective refrigerator. In the middle of the building there is 2 large door  with two marks for the official border line marks.  Canadian officers are often called for French translation to help their US coworkers.  It is the only crossing east of the Great Lakes that features a joint border inspection station.  It was built in 1987, one of just two created prior to the 1995 Canada-United States Accord on Our Shared Border.

Note that CBP currently (and historically) spells the border station "Alburg", while the municipality changed its spelling to "Alburgh" in 2006.

History
Prior to the construction of the joint border station, both the US and Canada had their own border stations at this location. These stations were responsible for collecting duty and performing inspections on vehicles crossing the border at several nearby north–south roads.  Signs directed traffic to report for inspection.

See also
 List of Canada–United States border crossings

References

Canada–United States border crossings
Geography of Grand Isle County, Vermont
Geography of Montérégie
1900 establishments in Quebec
1900 establishments in Vermont
Buildings and structures in Alburgh, Vermont